The Star Wars franchise involves multiple live-action and animated films. The film series started with a trilogy set in medias res that was later expanded to a trilogy of trilogies, known as the "Skywalker Saga".

The 1977 self-titled film, later subtitled Episode IV – A New Hope, was followed by the sequels The Empire Strikes Back (1980) and Return of the Jedi (1983), respectively subtitled onscreen as Episode V and Episode VI; these films form the original trilogy. Sixteen years later, the prequel trilogy was released, consisting of Star Wars: Episode I – The Phantom Menace (1999), Episode II – Attack of the Clones (2002), and Episode III – Revenge of the Sith (2005). After creator George Lucas sold the Star Wars franchise to Disney in 2012, a sequel trilogy consisting of Episodes VII through IX was released, consisting of Star Wars: The Force Awakens (2015), The Last Jedi (2017), and The Rise of Skywalker (2019).

The first three spin-off films produced were the made-for-television Star Wars Holiday Special (1978), The Ewok Adventure (1984) and Ewoks: The Battle for Endor (1985). Following Disney's 2012 acquisition of the franchise, these earlier films were dropped from the official canon, but the theatrical animated film Star Wars: The Clone Wars (2008) and its television series continuation retain their canonical status. Two standalone films were produced and released between the sequel trilogy films: Rogue One (2016) and Solo: A Star Wars Story (2018), both set between the original and prequel trilogies. An untitled movie from Taika Waititi has been officially announced as being written, while other unspecified films are reportedly in early stages of development.

The combined box office revenue of the films amounts to over ten billion dollars, and it is currently the second-highest-grossing film franchise. The major live-action releases (including all the films within the Skywalker Saga) were nominated for Academy Awards. The original film was nominated for most of the major categories, including Best Picture, Best Director, Best Original Screenplay, and Best Supporting Actor for Alec Guinness (who played Obi-Wan Kenobi), while all theatrical live-action films have been nominated for particular categories. Several official Star Wars television series have also been released, all now on Disney+.

Skywalker Saga
The main Star Wars film series is a trilogy of trilogies; as it neared completion, Disney began to refer to it as the "Skywalker Saga". It was released beginning with the original trilogy (Episodes IV, V and VI, 1977–1983), followed by the prequel trilogy (Episodes I, II and III, 1999–2005) and the sequel trilogy (Episodes VII, VIII and IX, 2015–2019). The first film released, Star Wars (1977), is the fourth film chronologically and was later subtitled Episode IV – A New Hope. The saga begins chronologically with Star Wars: Episode I – The Phantom Menace (1999) and concludes with Episode IX – The Rise of Skywalker (2019).

The story follows each generation of the Force-sensitive Skywalker family and their struggle against the evil Sith Lord Darth Sidious (Palpatine). The prequel trilogy focuses on Anakin Skywalker, his training as a Jedi, and his eventual fall to the dark side as Darth Vader due to Palpatine's machinations and his fear of losing his wife Padmé Amidala. The original trilogy follows their children, Luke and Leia, as they join the Rebel Alliance and battle Vader, Palpatine, and his Galactic Empire. The sequel trilogy features Kylo Ren (Ben Solo)—the son of Leia and Han Solo, nephew and former Jedi apprentice of Luke, and grandson of Padmé and Anakin—who fell to the dark side and seeks to rule the galaxy with Rey, the granddaughter of Palpatine and the last Jedi apprentice of Luke and Leia.

Each episodic film begins with an opening crawl, accompanied by the main Star Wars theme by John Williams, who composes the scores for each film. All nine films—most notably the original trilogy—have had retroactive changes made after their initial theatrical releases.

Standalone films
As Lucas was outlining a trilogy of trilogies, he also imagined making additional movies unrelated to the Skywalker Saga. The first theatrical films set outside the main episodic series were the Ewok spin-off films Caravan of Courage: An Ewok Adventure (1984) and Ewoks: The Battle for Endor (1985), the first of which was screened internationally after being produced for television.

After the conclusion of his then-six-episode saga in 2005, Lucas returned to spin-offs in the form of television series.
An animated film, The Clone Wars (2008), was released as a pilot to a TV series of the same name. An anthology series set between the main episodes entered development in parallel to the production of the sequel trilogy, described by Disney chief financial officer (CFO) Jay Rasulo as origin stories. The first entry, Rogue One: A Star Wars Story (2016), tells the story of the rebels who steal the Death Star plans directly before Episode IV. Solo: A Star Wars Story (2018) focuses on Han's backstory, also featuring Chewbacca and Lando Calrissian.

Animated film

The Clone Wars (2008)

Preceding the airing of the animated TV series in late 2008, the theatrical feature Star Wars: The Clone Wars was compiled from episodes "almost [as] an afterthought." It reveals that Anakin trained an apprentice between Attack of the Clones and Revenge of the Sith; the series explains Padawan Ahsoka Tano's absence from the latter film.  The film and series exist in the same level of canon as the episodic and anthology films.

Live-action films

Before selling Lucasfilm to Disney in 2012, and parallel to his development of a sequel trilogy, George Lucas and original trilogy  Lawrence Kasdan started development on a standalone film about a young Han Solo. In February 2013, Disney CEO Bob Iger made public the development of a Kasdan film and Entertainment Weekly reported that it would focus on Han Solo. Disney CFO Jay Rasulo has described the standalone films as origin stories. Lucasfilm president Kathleen Kennedy confirmed that there was "no attempt being made to carry characters (from the standalone films) in and out of the saga episodes." The standalone films released so far are subtitled "A Star Wars Story".

Rogue One: A Star Wars Story (2016)

Rogue One is set directly before Episode IV: A New Hope and focuses on the eponymous group of rebels who obtain the plans to the Death Star. Its laser was developed by scientist Galen Erso (played by Mads Mikkelsen) after the Empire forcibly abducted him, separating him from his daughter Jyn. Galen secretly sends a defecting Imperial pilot, Bodhi Rook, to deliver a message warning of the weapon's existence and revealing its weakness to his rebel friend Saw Gerrera. Under the false promise of her father's liberation, Jyn agrees to help Rebel Alliance intelligence officer Cassian Andor and his droid K-2SO retrieve the message from Saw, now the paranoid leader of an extremist cell of rebels.

The idea for the movie came from John Knoll, the chief creative officer of Industrial Light & Magic. In May 2014, Lucasfilm announced Gareth Edwards as the director of an anthology film, with Gary Whitta writing the first draft for a release on December 16, 2016. The film's title was revealed to be Rogue One, with Chris Weitz rewriting the script, and Felicity Jones in the starring role. Ben Mendelsohn and Diego Luna also play new characters, with James Earl Jones returning to voice Darth Vader. Edwards stated, "It comes down to a group of individuals who don't have magical powers that have to somehow bring hope to the galaxy." The film was the first to feature characters introduced in animated Star Wars TV series, namely The Clone Wars Saw Gerrera, portrayed by Forest Whitaker in the film. The movie received generally positive reviews, with its performances, action sequences, soundtrack, visual effects and darker tone being praised. The film grossed over million worldwide within a week of its release.

Solo: A Star Wars Story (2018)

Solo, the second anthology film, focuses on Han Solo about 10 years before A New Hope. After an escape attempt from his Imperial-occupied home planet of Corellia goes wrong, a young Han vows to return to rescue his girlfriend Qi'ra. Han "Solo" joins the Imperial Academy; however, he is expelled for his reckless behavior. Han and his newfound Wookiee friend Chewbacca resort to a criminal life, mentored by veteran smuggler Tobias Beckett. After angering gangster Dryden Vos, Han and his company's lives depend on pulling a heist for him. Without a ship to travel, they hire Lando Calrissian, the captain and owner of the Millennium Falcon.

Before selling Lucasfilm to Disney, George Lucas had hired Star Wars original trilogy veteran Lawrence Kasdan to write a film about a young Han Solo. The film stars Alden Ehrenreich as a young Han Solo, Joonas Suotamo as Chewbacca (after serving as a double for the character in The Force Awakens and The Last Jedi), Donald Glover as Lando Calrissian, Emilia Clarke as Qi'ra, and Woody Harrelson as Beckett. Lucasfilm originally hired Phil Lord and Christopher Miller to direct, but they were fired during principal photography, and replaced by Ron Howard. A twist ending acknowledges one of the major story arcs of The Clone Wars and Rebels animated series, while leaving the story open ended for sequels.

Future films

In mid-2018, Lucasfilm confirmed that multiple anthology films were in development, with their release following a hiatus after 2019's The Rise of Skywalker. Two films are scheduled for December 2025 and 2027.

Kathleen Kennedy stated in May 2022 that "There's a couple of [filmmakers] that we've been in conversation with over quite a long period of time that I'm hoping will come in" to oversee future films in the same way that Jon Favreau and Dave Filoni have done for multiple Star Wars television series. Kennedy stated that "We need to create a whole new saga" and that the sequel trilogy era was likely to be expanded from. According to The Hollywood Reporter, the next film in the franchise may be announced at April 2023's Star Wars Celebration.

Taika Waititi film (TBA)
As of May 2022, his film was expected to be released before Rogue Squadron (originally scheduled for December 2023 prior to its delay and cancellation), with Kathleen Kennedy asserting that Waititi's film may be released in late 2023. In June 2022, Waititi agreed with Kennedy's view that the films should move into new territory in favor of origin stories, and stated he would continue writing the project through the end of 2022 while filming other projects. In early July, The Hollywood Reporter indicated that "an early 2023 start" was being considered. The movie will reportedly be shot in Los Angeles. By March 2023, Waititi was also likely to appear in the film.

Unspecified projects
Rian Johnson, the writer/director of The Last Jedi (2017), is confirmed to write and direct the first film of a new trilogy he was outlining as of early 2019, when it was said to differ from the Skywalker-focused films in favor of focusing on new characters and possibly a different era than the main film franchise. The project was considered to have been "back-burnered" by May 2022 due to Johnson's involvement with other projects, including the Knives Out franchise. In October, Johnson indicated that he would make at least one more film in that series before returning to Star Wars.

In October 2022, The Hollywood Reporter (THR) reported that after a two-week writers' room in July (which included Patrick Somerville, Rayna McClendon, Andy Greenwald, and maybe Dave Filoni), Damon Lindelof and Justin Britt-Gibson were  a Star Wars film, with Ms. Marvel director Sharmeen Obaid-Chinoy attached as director. THR reported that according to its sources, "the project is intended as a stand-alone but in success could lead to more movies", taking place after the sequel trilogy and possibly featuring some of its characters.

In November 2022, Deadline Hollywood reported that Shawn Levy was in talks to direct a Star Wars film, following his work on Deadpool 3 (2024) and the fifth and final season of Stranger Things.

Produced for television
The first spin-off film (also the first sequel to be released) was a holiday TV special aired in 1978. Two live-action TV films created in the mid-1980s feature the Ewoks.

Star Wars Holiday Special (1978)

Produced for CBS in 1978, the Star Wars Holiday Special was a two-hour television special, in the format of a variety show. Stars of the original film and archive footage from the original Star Wars film appeared alongside celebrity guest stars in plot-related skits, musical numbers, and an animated segment, all loosely tied together by the premise of Chewbacca's family waiting for his arrival for the "Life Day" celebration on his home planet, Kashyyyk. The special is notorious for its extremely negative reception and was aired only once. Only the 11-minute animated sequence, which features the debut of bounty hunter Boba Fett, was positively received.

Ewok films
The Ewoks from Return of the Jedi were featured in two spin-off television films, The Ewok Adventure and Ewoks: The Battle for Endor. Both aired on ABC on the Thanksgiving weekends of 1984 and 1985, respectively, with at least the first also being given a limited international theatrical release. Warwick Davis reprised his debut role as the main Ewok, Wicket, in both. They are set between the events of The Empire Strikes Back and Return of the Jedi. Both films were released on VHS, LaserDisc, and on a double-feature DVD. Although based on stories written by George Lucas, they do not bear Star Wars in their titles, and were considered to exist in a lower level of canon than the episodic films. Following Disney's acquisition of the franchise, they were excluded from the canon. The Battle for Endor would be the last live-action Star Wars television project produced by Lucasfilm until 2019's The Mandalorian.

The Ewok Adventure (1984)
In a story by Lucas and a screenplay by Bob Carrau, the Towani family spaceship shipwrecks on the forest moon of Endor. While trying to repair their ship, the castaway family is split, when a giant creature known as the Gorax kidnaps the parents. Taking pity on the kids, a group of native Ewoks led by Wicket decides to help little Cindel Towani and her older brother Mace, rescue their parents. Among other stylistic choices making the film unique from the Star Wars episodes is the inclusion of a narrator.

Ewoks: The Battle for Endor (1985)
The sequel focuses on the Ewoks protecting their village from marauders led by the evil Lord Terak, who killed all the members of the Towani family except for Cindel, in search of a power battery. It was followed by the TV series Ewoks (1985–1987).

Produced for Disney+

Biomes (2021)
A short depicting various biomes of the Star Wars universe debuted on Disney+ on May 4, 2021.

Zen - Grogu and Dust Bunnies (2022)
In November 2022, a Studio Ghibli-produced animated short film was released featuring Grogu from The Mandalorian.

A Droid Story
In December 2020, A Droid Story, an animated adventure film for Disney+ was announced.

Reception

Box office performance
The Star Wars films are the second-highest-grossing film franchise of all time worldwide, behind the Marvel Cinematic Universe, having grossed over $10 billion at the global box office.

Critical response

Accolades

Academy Awards
The eleven live-action films together have been nominated for 37 Academy Awards, of which they have won seven. The films were also awarded a total of three Special Achievement Awards. The Empire Strikes Back and Return of the Jedi received Special Achievement Awards for their visual effects, and Star Wars received a Special Achievement Award for its alien, creature and robot voices.

Grammy Awards
The franchise has received a total of fifteen Grammy Award nominations, winning six.

Notes

Library of Congress
In 1989, the Library of Congress selected the original Star Wars film for preservation in the U.S. National Film Registry, as being "culturally, historically, or aesthetically significant." The Empire Strikes Back was selected in 2010, while Return of the Jedi was selected in 2021. 35mm reels of the 1997 Special Editions were the versions initially presented for preservation because of the difficulty of transferring from the original prints, but it was later revealed that the Library possessed a copyright deposit print of the original theatrical releases. By 2015, Star Wars had been transferred to a 2K scan which can be viewed by appointment.

Emmy Awards
Caravan of Courage: An Ewok Adventure was one of four films to be juried-awarded Emmys for Outstanding Special Visual Effects at the 37th Primetime Emmy Awards. The film was additionally nominated for Outstanding Children's Program but lost in this category to an episode of American Playhouse.

At the 38th Primetime Emmy Awards, Ewoks: The Battle for Endor and the CBS documentary Dinosaur! were both juried-awarded Emmys for Outstanding Special Visual Effects. The film additionally received two nominations for Outstanding Children's Program and Outstanding Sound Mixing for a Miniseries or a Special.

Unproduced and abandoned projects

In the 2000s Zack Snyder pitched an adult-oriented film to Lucasfilm, but conversations ceased by the time Disney acquired the company in 2012. The project was redeveloped as Rebel Moon (2023).

In early 2013, Bob Iger announced the development of a spin-off film written by Simon Kinberg, reported by Entertainment Weekly to focus on bounty hunter Boba Fett during the original trilogy. In mid-2014, Josh Trank was officially announced as the director of an undisclosed spin-off film, but had left the project a year later due to creative differences, causing a teaser for the film to be scrapped from Star Wars Celebration. By October 2018, the Fett film was reportedly no longer in production, with the studio instead focusing on The Mandalorian, which utilizes a similar character.

Rogue One and Solo actors Felicity Jones, Alden Ehrenreich and Emilia Clarke all stated that their contracts also included future installments. Solo director Ron Howard said that while no sequel was in development, it was up to the fans to decide. Kennedy and Glover also said that a film focusing on Lando could happen, but was not a priority. (A Lando series was later announced.) Although critics noted that Solo left room open for sequels, in 2022, Howard confirmed that the studio had no plans to make one.

In August 2017, it was rumored that films focused on Jabba the Hutt, and Jedi Masters Obi-Wan Kenobi and Yoda were being considered or were in development. At D23 Expo in August 2019, a TV series about the character was announced to be produced instead, which was released in 2022.

Game of Thrones creators David Benioff and D. B. Weiss were to write and produce a trilogy of Star Wars films scheduled to be released in December 2022, 2024, and 2026, which were first announced to be in development in February 2018. The duo stepped away from the project in October 2019, citing their commitment to a Netflix deal, although Kennedy stated her openness to their returning when their schedules allow.

In April 2019, Kathleen Kennedy was asked by MTV News about a potential Knights of the Old Republic adaption and stated, "Yes, we are developing something to look at. Right now, I have no idea where things might fall." The following month, BuzzFeed News reported that Laeta Kalogridis had been hired in the spring of 2018 to write a film based on the 2003 video game, and that she was close to completing the first script of a potential trilogy.

In September 2019, Marvel Cinematic Universe producer Kevin Feige reportedly began developing a Star Wars film with Kennedy; Michael Waldron was later announced to write the screenplay. In May 2022, Waldron confirmed the project was moving forward and that it would more or less stand alone, however in a separate interview the same month Kennedy denied that the film was in active development. By March 2023, it was reportedly no longer in development.

J. D. Dillard and Luke Cage writer Matt Owens were reportedly involved in the early stages of developing a film in February 2020, which may have taken place on the Sith planet Exegol. In November 2022, Dillard announced that he was no longer involved in the project.

On December 10, 2020, during Disney Investor Day, Wonder Woman (2017) director Patty Jenkins was announced as the director of a film titled Rogue Squadron, initially set to be released on December 22, 2023. According to the official Star Wars website, the film would "introduce a new generation of starfighter pilots as they earn their wings and risk their lives in a boundary-pushing, high-speed thrill-ride, and move the saga into the future era of the galaxy." According to Jenkins, the film would be an original story "with great influence from the games and the books". A script was being worked on as of December 2020, at which time, Wonder Woman 3 story was still being worked on. Matthew Robinson was hired to write Rogue Squadron in May 2021; late the next month, Jenkins revealed that the script was almost finished. On November 8, the film's production was delayed from 2022 due to Jenkins' busy schedule. A month later, Jenkins had left her planned Cleopatra film as director in order to focus on Rogue Squadron and Wonder Woman 3. Disney announced in April 2022 that the film was still set to be released in December 2023. Kathleen Kennedy stated in May that the film has been "pushed off to the side for the moment", with the script still being worked on and Waititi's film expected to be released first. On September 15, 2022, the film was confirmed to be taken off from Disney's release schedule, although in December Jenkins said she was actively working on it amid the apparent cancellation of Wonder Woman 3. By March 2023, it was reportedly no longer in development.

Documentaries 
Documentary films about Star Wars released by Lucasfilm include:
 The Making of Star Wars (1977)
 SP FX: The Empire Strikes Back (1980)
 Classic Creatures: Return of the Jedi (1983)
 From Star Wars to Jedi: The Making of a Saga (1983)
 The Beginning: Making 'Episode I''' (2001)
 From Puppets to Pixels: Digital Characters in 'Episode II (2002)
 The Story of Star Wars (2004)
 Empire of Dreams: The Story of the Star Wars Trilogy (2004)
 Star Wars: Heroes & Villains (2005)
 Within a Minute: The Making of Episode III (2005)
 Star Wars: The Legacy Revealed (2007)
 Secrets of the Force Awakens: A Cinematic Journey (2016)
 The Force of Sound (2018)
 The Director and the Jedi (2018)
 The Skywalker Legacy (2020)
 Under the Helmet: The Legacy of Boba Fett (2021)
 Obi-Wan Kenobi: A Jedi's Return (2022)

See also
 List of Star Wars cast members
 List of Star Wars characters

 Parodies 
 Hardware Wars (1977)
 Spaceballs (1987)
 Thumb Wars (1999)
 Robot Chicken: Star Wars (2007)
 Laugh It Up, Fuzzball: The Family Guy Trilogy (2010)

Footnotes

ReferencesCitations'''

Sources

External links

Star Wars
Films